The Brit Award for British Female Solo Artist was an award given by the British Phonographic Industry (BPI), an organisation which represents record companies and artists in the United Kingdom. The accolade was presented at the Brit Awards, an annual celebration of British and international music. The winners and nominees are determined by the Brit Awards voting academy with over one-thousand members, which comprise record labels, publishers, managers, agents, media, and previous winners and nominees. The award was first presented in 1977 as British Female Solo Artist and for the last time in 2021, as gendered categories have been dropped for 2022.

British Female Solo Artist has been won by Annie Lennox the most times, with six wins (including four when she was the vocalist of Eurythmics, rather than for her solo career) and have received the most nominations, with nine, followed by Kate Bush with eight. As international artist categories only began in 1989, American singer Randy Crawford won the award in 1982.

Winners and nominees

Artists with multiple wins

Artists with multiple nominations

9 nominations
 Annie Lennox

8 nominations
 Kate Bush

7 nominations
 PJ Harvey

6 nominations

 Sade
 Lisa Stansfield

5 nominations

 Laura Marling
 Alison Moyet
 Amy Winehouse

4 nominations

 Lily Allen
 Paloma Faith
 Florence and the Machine
 Jamelia
 Jessie Ware
 Kim Wilde

3 nominations

 Adele
 Bat for Lashes
 Dido
 Sophie Ellis-Bextor
 Gabrielle
 Ellie Goulding
 Beth Orton
 Toyah Willcox

2 nominations

 Joan Armatrading
 Natasha Bedingfield
 Dina Carroll
 Beverley Craven
 Des'ree
 Sheena Easton
 Michelle Gayle
 Jess Glynne
 Geri Halliwell
 Jessie J
 Beverley Knight
 Lianne La Havas
 Leona Lewis
 Dua Lipa
 Shara Nelson
 Mica Paris
 Eddi Reader
 Louise Redknapp
 Emeli Sandé
 Dusty Springfield
 KT Tunstall
 FKA Twigs
 Bonnie Tyler
 Tracey Ullman
 Yazz

See also
 List of music awards honoring women

Notes
 Lisa Stansfield (1990), Duffy (2009), Dua Lipa (2018) also won Brit Award for Best New Artist
 Adele (2008), Ellie Goulding (2010), Emeli Sandé (2012) also won Brit Award for Rising Star
 Ms. Dynamite (2003), Joss Stone (2005) also won Brit Award for British Urban Act

References

Brit Awards
Music awards honoring women
Awards established in 1977
Awards established in 1982
Awards disestablished in 1977
Awards disestablished in 2021